Pomlé Stadium is a home football stadium in Šamorín, Slovakia. It serves as home stadium for football club FC ŠTK 1914 Šamorín. The stadium has a capacity of 1,950 (750 seats).

External links 
Stadium website

References

Football venues in Slovakia
Buildings and structures in Trnava Region
Sports venues completed in 1931